Paul Reubens (born Rubenfeld; August 27, 1952) is an American actor, comedian, writer, producer, and children's entertainer. He is known for his character Pee-wee Herman. Reubens joined the Los Angeles troupe The Groundlings in the 1970s, and started his career as an improvisational comedian and stage actor. In 1982, Reubens began appearing in a show about a character he had been developing for years. The show was called The Pee-wee Herman Show, and ran for five sold-out months; HBO also produced a successful special about it. Pee-wee became an instant cult figure and, for the next decade, Reubens was completely committed to his character, doing all of his public appearances and interviews as Pee-wee. His feature film, Pee-wee's Big Adventure (1985), directed by Tim Burton, was a financial and critical success, and soon developed into a cult film. Its sequel, Big Top Pee-wee (1988), was less successful. Between 1986 and 1990, Reubens starred as Pee-wee in the CBS Saturday-morning children's program Pee-wee's Playhouse.

Thereafter, Reubens decided to take a sabbatical from Pee-wee. In July 1991, Reubens was arrested for indecent exposure in an adult theater in Sarasota, Florida. The arrest set off a chain reaction of national media attention that changed the general public's view of Reubens and Pee-wee. The arrest postponed Reubens's involvement in major projects until 1999, when he appeared in several big-budget projects including Mystery Men (1999) and Blow (2001), and Reubens started giving interviews as himself rather than as Pee-wee.

Since 2006, Reubens has been making cameos and appearances in numerous projects, such as Reno 911! (2006), 30 Rock (2007), Pushing Daisies (2007), Life During Wartime (2009), The Blacklist (2014–2015), Accidental Love (2015) and Mosaic (2018). He also played the voice role of Pavel in the Disney XD television series Tron: Uprising (2012–2013). Since the 1990s, Reubens has worked on two possible Pee-wee films: one dark and adult, dubbed The Pee-wee Herman Story, the other a family-friendly epic adventure called Pee-wee’s Playhouse: The Movie. In 2010, he starred on Broadway in The Pee-wee Herman Show. In 2016, Reubens co-wrote and starred in the Netflix original film Pee-wee's Big Holiday, reprising his role as Pee-wee Herman.

Early life

Reubens was born Paul Rubenfeld in Peekskill, New York in 1952, and grew up in Sarasota, Florida, where his parents, Judy (Rosen) and Milton Rubenfeld, owned a lamp store. His mother was a teacher. His father was an automobile salesperson who had flown for Britain's Royal Air Force and for the U.S. Army Air Forces in World War II, and later became one of the founding pilots of the Israeli Air Force during the 1948 Arab–Israeli War. An Orthodox Jew, he was one of five Jewish pilots to fly against Arab forces in smuggled fighter planes. 

Reubens's two younger siblings are Luke (born 1958), who is a dog trainer, and Abby (born 1953), who is an attorney and a board member of the American Civil Liberties Union of Tennessee.

Reubens spent much of his childhood in Oneonta, New York. As a child, he frequented the Ringling Bros. and Barnum & Bailey Circus, whose winter headquarters were in Sarasota. The circus atmosphere sparked Reubens' interest in entertainment, and influenced his later work. He also loved to watch reruns of I Love Lucy, which made him want to make people laugh. At age 5, Reubens asked his father to build him a stage, where he and his siblings would act out plays.

Reubens attended Sarasota High School, where he was named president of the National Thespian Society. He was accepted into Northwestern University's summer program for gifted high-school students, joined the local Asolo Theater, Players of Sarasota Theater, and appeared in several plays. 

After high school graduation, he attended Boston University, and began auditioning for acting schools. He was turned down by several schools, including Juilliard, and twice by Carnegie-Mellon, before being accepted to the California Institute of the Arts. Reubens moved to California, where he worked in restaurant kitchens and as a Fuller Brush salesman.

In the 1970s, Reubens began performing at local comedy clubs, and made four guest appearances on The Gong Show (out of a total of fourteen guest appearances) as part of a boy–girl act he had developed with Charlotte McGinnis, called The Hilarious Betty and Eddie. He soon joined the Los Angeles–based improvisational comedy team The Groundlings. He remained a troupe member for six years, working with Bob McClurg, John Paragon, Susan Barnes, and Phil Hartman. Hartman and Reubens became friends, and often wrote and worked on material together. In 1980, Reubens had a small part as a waiter in The Blues Brothers.

Pee-wee Herman

The character of "Pee-wee Herman" originated during a 1978 improvisation exercise with The Groundlings, where Reubens came up with the idea of a man who wanted to be a comic but was so inept at telling jokes that it was obvious to the audience that he would never make it. Fellow Groundling Phil Hartman afterwards helped Reubens develop the character while another Groundling, John Paragon, helped write the show. Despite being compared to other famous characters, such as Hergé's Tintin and Collodi's Pinocchio, Reubens says that there is no specific source for "Pee-wee" other than a collection of ideas. Pee-wee's voice originated in 1970 when Reubens appeared in a production of Life with Father, where he was cast as one of the most obnoxious characters in the play. For this role, Reubens adopted a cartoon-like way of speaking, whose voice became Pee-wee's. 

Pee-wee's first name came from a one-inch Pee Wee brand harmonica Reubens had as a child, and the surname Herman was the last name of an energetic boy Reubens knew from his youth. The first small gray suit Pee-wee ever wore had been handmade for Groundlings Director and Founder Gary Austin, who passed it on to Reubens. The origin of the red tie is less clear, as Reubens claims "someone" handed him the "little kid bow tie" before a performance.

The Pee-wee Herman Show: 1981–1984

Reubens auditioned for Saturday Night Live for the 1980–1981 season, but Gilbert Gottfried, who was a close friend of the show's producer and had the same acting style as Reubens, got the job. Reubens was so angry and bitter that he decided he would borrow money and start his own show in Los Angeles using the character he had been developing during the last few years, "Pee-wee Herman".

With the help of other Groundlings like John Paragon, Phil Hartman and Lynne Marie Stewart, Pee-wee acquired a small group of followers and Reubens took his show to The Roxy Theatre where The Pee-wee Herman Show ran for five sellout months, doing midnight shows for adults and weekly matinees for children, moving into the mainstream when HBO aired The Pee-wee Herman Show in 1981 as part of their series On Location. Reubens also appeared as Pee-wee in the 1980 film Cheech & Chong's Next Movie. He again appeared in 1981's Cheech & Chong's Nice Dreams; the end credits of the movie billed him as Hamburger Dude. Reubens's act had mainly positive reactions and quickly acquired a group of fans, despite being described as "bizarre", and Reubens being described as "the weirdest comedian around". Pee-wee was both "corny" and "hip", "retrograde" and "avant-garde".

When Pee-wee's fame started growing, Reubens started to move away from the spotlight, keeping his name under wraps and making all his public appearance and interviews in character while billing Pee-wee as playing himself; Reubens was trying to "get the public to think that that was a real person". Later on he would even prefer his parents be known only as Honey Herman and Herman Herman. In the early and mid-1980s, Reubens made several guest appearances on Late Night with David Letterman as Pee-wee Herman which gave Pee-wee an even bigger following. During the mid-1980s, Reubens traveled the United States with a whole new The Pee-wee Herman Show, playing at the Guthrie Theater in Minneapolis, Caroline's in New York City and, in 1984, in front of a full Carnegie Hall.

Pee-wee's Big Adventure: 1985

The success of The Pee-wee Herman Show prompted Warner Bros. to hire Reubens to write a script for a full-length Pee-wee Herman film. Reubens's original idea was to do a remake of Pollyanna, which Reubens claims is his favorite film. Halfway through writing the script, Reubens noticed everyone at Warner Bros. had a bike with them, which inspired Reubens to start on a new script with Phil Hartman. When Reubens and the producers of Pee-wee's Big Adventure saw Tim Burton's work on Vincent and Frankenweenie, they chose Burton to be the film's director. The film tells the story of Pee-wee Herman embarking on nationwide adventure in search of his stolen bicycle. The movie went on to gross $40,940,662 domestically, recouping almost six times its $7 million budget. At the time of release in 1985, the film received mixed reviews, but Pee-wee's Big Adventure developed into a cult film.

Pee-wee's Playhouse: 1986–1991

After seeing the success of Pee-wee's Big Adventure, the CBS network approached Reubens with an ill-received cartoon series proposal. In 1986, CBS agreed to sign Reubens to act, produce, and direct his live-action children's program, Pee-wee's Playhouse, with a budget of $325,000 per episode, the same price as a prime-time sitcom, and no creative interference from CBS; although CBS did request a few minor changes throughout the years. After casting actors like Laurence Fishburne and S. Epatha Merkerson, production began in New York City. The opening credits of the show were sung by Cyndi Lauper.
Playhouse was designed as an educational yet entertaining and artistic show for children and, despite being greatly influenced by 1950s shows Reubens watched as a child like The Rocky and Bullwinkle Show, The Mickey Mouse Club, Captain Kangaroo and Howdy Doody, it quickly acquired a dual audience of kids and grownups. Reubens, always trying to make Pee-wee a positive role model, created a consciously moral show, one that would teach children the ethics of reciprocity. Reubens believed that children liked the Playhouse because it was fast-paced, colorful and "never talked them down"; while parents liked the Playhouse because it reminded them of the past.

In 1986, Reubens (billed as Paul Mall) was the voice of the ship's computer in Flight of the Navigator. In 1987, Reubens provided the voice for the pilot droid RX-24 a.k.a. Captain "Rex" in Star Tours, a Star Wars-themed motion simulator attraction at Disneyland and Disney-MGM Studios at Walt Disney World, and Disneyland Paris. He also reprised the role of Pee-wee Herman in cameo appearances in the film Back to the Beach and TV show Sesame Street, the latter of which made a cameo in Playhouse.

Right after the success of Pee-wee's Big Adventure, Reubens began working with Paramount Pictures on a sequel entitled Big Top Pee-wee. Reubens and George McGrath's script was directed by Grease director Randal Kleiser. The film was not as successful as its predecessor, receiving mild reviews and doing just over one third as well in the box office, earning only $15 million.

Reubens attended 1988 Academy Awards with Big Top Pee-wee co-star Valeria Golino, which stirred rumors that the two were dating. The following year Reubens exchanged vows with Doris Duke's adopted daughter, Chandi Heffner, at a mock wedding over which Imelda Marcos presided, in Shangri-La, Doris Duke's mansion in Honolulu, Hawaii.

Pee-wee's Playhouse aired from September 13, 1986, until November 10, 1990. Reubens had originally agreed to do two more seasons after the third, and when CBS asked Reubens about the possibility of a sixth season he declined, wanting to take a sabbatical. Reubens had been suffering from burnout from playing Pee-wee full-time and had been warning that Pee-wee was temporary and that he had other ideas he would like to work on. The parties agreed to end the show after five seasons, which included 45 episodes and a Christmas Special. Playhouse garnered 15 Emmy Awards, all of them in the Creative Arts Emmy Award category.

Pee-wee's legacy
Reubens had not always thought of his character as one for children, but sometime during the mid-1980s, he started forming Pee-wee into the best role model he possibly could, making the program a morally positive show that cared about issues like racial diversity. Reubens was also careful of what should and should not be associated with Pee-wee. Being a heavy smoker, he went to great lengths never to be photographed with a cigarette in his mouth, even refusing to endorse candy bars and other kinds of junk food, all the while trying to release his own sugar-free cereal "Ralston Purina Pee-wee Chow cereal", a project that died after a blind test.

With his positive attitude and quirkiness, Pee-wee became an instant cult figure, earning a star on the Hollywood Walk of Fame by 1989, and successfully building a Pee-wee franchise, with toys, clothes and other items generating more than $25 million at its peak in 1988. Reubens also published a book as Pee-wee in 1989 called Travels with Pee-Wee. CBS aired reruns of Playhouse until July 1991, when Reubens was arrested, pulling from their schedule the last two remaining reruns. Fox Family Channel briefly aired reruns of the Playhouse in 1998. In early July 2006, Cartoon Network began running a teaser promo during its Adult Swim lineup. A later press release and many other promos confirmed that the show's 45 original episodes would nightly air from Monday to Thursday starting on that date. Playhouse attracted 1.5 million viewers nightly. In 2007, TV Guide named Playhouse one of the top 10 TV cult classics of all time. Several children's television personas cite Pee-wee Herman as an inspiration, including Blue's Clues' Steve Burns and SpongeBob SquarePants' Stephen Hillenburg.

In November 2004, all 45 episodes of the Playhouse, plus six episodes that had never before been released on home video, were released on DVD split between two box set collections. On July 3, 2013, Shout! Factory announced that they had acquired the rights to the entire series from Reubens, which was released on Blu-ray on October 21, 2014. In addition, the entire series was digitally remastered from the original 35mm film elements and original audio tracks.

Pee-wee's small glen plaid suits seemed ridiculous during the 1980s, but since the late 1990s have made him a "style icon", with fashion houses and designers like Christopher Bailey, Ennio Capasa, Miuccia Prada, Viktor & Rolf, and Thom Browne creating tightly cut suits with high armholes and short trousers that have been compared to Pee-wee's. In early 2007 Nike released a collection of Nike SB sneakers called "Fallen Heroes". The collection was loosely inspired by Milli Vanilli, MC Hammer, Vanilla Ice, and Pee-wee Herman. Pee-wee's sneakers use a gray and white color scheme with red detail, with an illustration on the insole of a man in a suit sitting alone in a theatre with his hand on his lap suggesting Reubens's 1991 theatre arrest.

Reubens has mentioned he has plans for a museum, which would contain many of the Playhouse sets and props he still owns.

1991 arrest and retreat from public eye
In July 1991, Reubens was arrested in Sarasota, Florida for masturbating while watching a film at an adult movie theater. During a random police inspection, a detective detained Reubens, along with three others, as he was preparing to leave. When detectives examined his driver's license, Reubens told them "I'm Pee-wee Herman" and offered to perform a children's benefit for the sheriff's office "to take care of this." The next day, after a local reporter recognized Reubens's name, Reubens's attorney extended the same offer to the Sarasota Herald-Tribune in exchange for withholding the story. In 1971, Reubens had been arrested in the same county for loitering and prowling near an adult theater, though charges had been dropped. His second arrest occurred in 1983 when Reubens was placed on two years of probation for possession of marijuana, although adjudication was withheld. On the night of the arrest, Reubens traveled to Nashville, where his sister and lawyer lived, and then to New Jersey, where he stayed for the following months at his friend Doris Duke's estate.

The 1991 arrest was widely covered, and Reubens and his character both became the subject of ridicule. Disney-MGM Studios suspended a video from its studio tour that had showed Pee-wee explaining how voiceover tracks are produced. Toys "R" Us removed Pee-wee toys from its stores. 

Pee-wee's Playhouse had already ended by the time Reubens was arrested. He cited an overworked crew and a decline in the show's quality in his decision against making a sixth season. The show's popularity and quantity of episodes had allowed for rerun broadcasts, but CBS canceled the reruns on July 29, 1991. 

Reubens released a statement denying the charges. On November 7, 1991, he pleaded no contest. The plea avoided a charge on Reubens's record but obligated him to 75 hours of community service. As part of his service, he created, produced and financed two antidrug public-service announcements.

Despite the negative publicity, many artists who knew Reubens, such as Cyndi Lauper, Annette Funicello, Zsa Zsa Gabor and Valeria Golino, voiced support. Bill Cosby defended Reubens, saying, "Whatever [Reubens has] done, this is being blown all out of proportion." Others who knew Reubens, such as Pee-wee's Playhouse production designer Gary Panter, S. Epatha Merkerson and Big Top Pee-wee director Randal Kleiser, also spoke in support. Reubens's fans organized support rallies after CBS canceled the reruns, picketing in Los Angeles, New York and San Francisco. The television news magazine A Current Affair received "tens of thousands" of responses to a Pee-wee telephone survey in which callers supported Reubens by a nine-to-one ratio.

Reubens did not offer interviews or appear on talk shows, but he did appear as Pee-wee at the 1991 MTV Video Music Awards on September 5, asking the audience, "Heard any good jokes lately?" He received a standing ovation. Reubens appeared as Pee-wee only once in 1992, when he participated in a Grand Ole Opry tribute to Minnie Pearl.

1990s and comeback in Blow
During the 1990s, Reubens kept a low profile, dedicating himself to writing and collecting a variety of things, "everything from fake food, to lamps", although he did do some dubbing and took small parts in films such as 1992's Buffy the Vampire Slayer and Tim Burton's Batman Returns (Reubens portrayed the Penguin's father) and 1996's Matilda and Dunston Checks In. In 1993, he voiced the character Lock in another one of Burton's productions, The Nightmare Before Christmas. (Reubens later voiced Lock for the video game The Nightmare Before Christmas: Oogie's Revenge in 2004.)

Reubens dated actress Debi Mazar in 1993 after he started attending film premieres with her. Reubens has since credited Mazar with ending his depression from his arrest.

During the mid-1990s, Reubens played a recurring role on the TV series Murphy Brown. The role earned him positive reviews and his first and only non-Pee-wee Emmy nomination, for Outstanding Guest Actor in a Comedy Series. He appeared six times on the show between 1995 and 1997. Afterward, Reubens began working on an NBC pilot entitled Meet the Muckles, a show that would be based on You Can't Take It with You. The project got stuck in development hell, and was later dropped when Reubens's ideas grew too elaborate and expensive, although Philip Rosenthal blamed NBC's negative response on Reubens being on a "blacklist".

By 1999, Reubens had given several interviews as himself and made public appearances while promoting the movie Mystery Men, the first being on The Tonight Show with Jay Leno in 1999. He also starred in Dwight Yoakam's Western South of Heaven, West of Hell, portraying a rapist and killer. In 2001, Reubens had his first extended television role since Playhouse, as the host of the short-lived ABC game show You Don't Know Jack, based on the game of the same name. It was cancelled after six episodes due to low ratings.

Reubens played a flamboyant hairdresser turned drug dealer in Ted Demme's 2001 drama Blow, which starred Penélope Cruz and Johnny Depp. His performance was praised and he began receiving scripts for potential movie projects.

2002 pornography arrest
In November 2002, while filming David LaChapelle's video for Elton John's "This Train Don't Stop There Anymore", Reubens learned that police were at his home with a search warrant, acting on a tip from a witness in the pornography case against actor Jeffrey Jones, finding among over 70,000 items of kitsch memorabilia, two grainy videotapes, and dozens of photographs that the city attorney's office characterized as a collection of child pornography. Kelly Bush, Reubens's personal representative at the time, said the description of the items was inaccurate and claimed the objects were "Rob Lowe's sex videotape, and a few 30- to 100-year-old kitsch collectible images." 

The district attorney looked at Reubens's collection and computer and found no grounds for bringing any felony charges against him, while the city attorney, Rocky Delgadillo, formally charged Reubens on the last day allowed by statute. Reubens was represented by Hollywood criminal defense lawyer Blair Berk. 

In December he pleaded not guilty through Berk, who also complained that the city attorney failed to turn over evidence to the defense, to which City Attorney Richard Katz countered that prosecutors were not required to do so until after arraignment. Later, evidence was secured by the defense. Neither side disclosed its contents.

In March 2004, child pornography charges were dropped in exchange for Reubens's guilty plea to a lesser misdemeanor obscenity charge. For the next three years, he was required to register his address with the sheriff's office and he could not be in the company of minors without the permission of their parent or legal guardian. 

Reubens later stated that he was a collector of erotica, including films, muscle magazines, and a sizable collection of mostly homosexual vintage erotica, such as photographic studies of teen nudes. Reubens said that what the city attorney's office viewed as pornography he considered to be innocent art, and that what they described as people underage engaged in masturbation or oral copulation was, in fact, a judgmental point of view. Reubens described the nude images as people "one hundred percent not" performing sexual acts. 

Being an avid collector, Reubens often purchased bulk lots, and one of his vintage magazine dealers declared that "there's no way" he could have known the content of each page in the publications he bought and he recalled Reubens asking for "physique magazines, vintage 1960s material, but not things featuring kids".

Reubens spent the next two years in Florida caring for his terminally ill father, who died in February 2004 of cancer.

Later career

2004–2008

Reubens has made cameos and guest appearances in numerous projects. He played Rick of the citizen's patrol on the popular Comedy Central series Reno 911!, which gained him a small role in the 2007 film Reno 911!: Miami. That same year he appeared in the second music video version of The Raconteurs song "Steady, As She Goes". The video has the band engaging in a comical soapbox car race, with Reubens playing the bad guy who sabotages the race.

In 2007, Reubens attended his own tribute at the SF Sketchfest, where he talked about his career with Ben Fong-Torres. He also signed with NBC to make a pilot on a show called Area 57, a sitcom about a passive-aggressive alien, but it was not picked up for the 2007–2008 season. Reubens did, however, appear on the hit NBC series 30 Rock as an inbred Austrian prince, a character Tina Fey created for him. He also made three guest appearances on FX's series Dirt. This time he was recommended for the role by Dirt star and close friend Courteney Cox. Cox's husband, David Arquette, then cast Reubens for his directorial debut, the 2007 film The Tripper.

Reubens has also had small parts dubbing or making cameos in a series of Cartoon Network projects such as the 2006 television film Re-Animated, the animated cartoon series Chowder, Tom Goes to the Mayor, and Tim and Eric Awesome Show, Great Job!.

In 2008, Reubens was slated to appear as homeopathic antidepressant salesman Alfredo Aldarisio in the third episode of Pushing Daisies, but the role was recast with Raúl Esparza. Reubens instead appeared in the role of Oscar Vibenius in the series' 7th and 9th episodes.

Also during 2008, Reubens did a PSA for Unscrew America, a website that aims to get people to change regular light bulbs for more energy-efficient ones in the form of CFLs and LED. He also appeared in Todd Solondz's Life During Wartime.

In 2009, Reubens voiced Bat-Mite in the Batman: The Brave and the Bold episode "Legends of the Dark Mite".

2009–present: the new Pee-wee Herman Show and future films

In January 2009, Reubens hinted that negotiations were under way for his stage show to come back, and in August the return of The Pee-wee Herman Show was announced. Reubens said he felt Pee-wee calling, "I just got up one day and felt like I'm gonna come back, that was it." The show is also a way to "introduce Pee-wee to the new generation that didn't know about it", preparing the way for Reubens's main project, the Playhouse movie. Before this comeback, Reubens's present age and shape had been pointed out as a possible issue, since Pee-wee's slim figure and clean skin have been one of his trademarks. But after appearing for the first time since 1992 as Pee-wee at Spike TV's 2007 Guys' Choice Awards, Reubens had remained optimistic and had jokingly said he's no longer nervous about being young Pee-wee again thanks to digital retouching.

The show was originally scheduled to begin November 8 and continue until the 29th at the Music Box Theater in Hollywood. Due to high demand, the show moved to Club Nokia @ LA Live and was scheduled to run between January 12, 2010, and February 7. To promote the show Reubens once again gave interviews in character, appearing as a guest on The Jay Leno Show, The Tonight Show with Conan O'Brien (as well as O'Brien's subsequent Legally Prohibited Tour) and Jimmy Kimmel Live! among others. A Twitter account, a Facebook account and a new website were made for Pee-wee after the show changed venues.

On November 11, 2010, the show relocated to New York for a limited run at the Stephen Sondheim Theatre, selling over $3 million in advance tickets. An extra performance was taped for the HBO network on January 6, 2011, and debuted March 19.

From 2012 to 2013 Reubens contributed his voice talents to the animated series Tron: Uprising as Pavel.

In 2014, Reubens appeared in TV on the Radio's music video for Happy Idiot.

Reubens went on to reprise his role as pilot droid Rex in Star Wars: Galaxy's Edge, a Star Wars-themed land that opened at Disneyland and Disney's Hollywood Studios at Walt Disney World in 2019. Reubens previously portrayed the character in the original Star Tours attraction in 1987, and Star Wars Rebels in 2014. In Galaxy's Edge, the former Star Tours pilot droid RX-24 – "Rex" – has been reprogrammed into DJ R-3X, the house DJ of a bar and restaurant called Oga's Cantina.

Pee-wee's Big Holiday and undeveloped scripts

Ever since Reubens started giving interviews again after his 2002 arrest, he has talked about the two scripts he has written for future Pee-wee Herman films.

Reubens once called his first script The Pee-wee Herman Story, describing it as a black comedy. He has also referred to the script as "dark Pee-wee" or "adult Pee-wee", with the plot involving Pee-wee becoming famous as a singer after making a hit single and moving to Hollywood, where "he does everything wrong and becomes a big jerk". Reubens further explained the film has many "Valley of the Dolls moments". Reubens thought this script would be the first one to start production, but in 2006 Reubens announced he was to start filming his second script in 2007.

The second film, a family-friendly adventure, is called Pee-wee's Playhouse: The Movie by Reubens, and follows Pee-wee and his Playhouse friends on a road-trip adventure, meaning that they would leave the house for the first time and go out into "Puppetland". All of the original characters of the show, live-action and puppets are included in Reubens's script. The story happens in a fantasy land that would be reminiscent of H.R. Pufnstuf and The Wonderful Wizard of Oz. In January 2009, Reubens told Gary Panter that the rejected first script of Pee-wee's Big Adventure (which they co-wrote) could have a movie deal very soon and that it would be "90 minutes of incredible beauty". In December 2009, while in character, Reubens said this film is "already done, the script is already fully written; It's ready to shoot." Most of the film will take place in Puppetland and claymation might be used.

Although he hasn't revealed much about the scripts, he has said that one of the two films opens in prison. He has also said that using CGI for "updating" the puppets' looks could be an option, but it all depended on the budget the films would have. Reubens once mentioned the possibility of doing one of the two as an animated film along the lines of The Polar Express, which uses performance capture technology, incorporating the movements of live actors into animated characters.

Reubens approached Pee-wee's Big Adventure director Tim Burton with one of the scripts and talked to Johnny Depp about the possibility of having him portray Pee-wee, but Burton was too busy, and Depp said he would have to think about it.

In January 2010, Reubens reprised his role as Pee-wee and reused the set of Pee-wee's Playhouse (albeit slightly modified) for a short sketch on Funny or Die. In the sketch, Pee-wee comes home and shows off a brand-new iPad given to him by Steve Jobs. This leads to a long argument between him and his puppet friends, who point out all of the iPad's disadvantages – even Conky himself points out its flaws by stating that "it looks like a giant iPhone". In the end, Pee-wee uses the iPad as a serving tray to hold glasses of milk and lemonade during a party being held at the Playhouse hours later. All the voices of the puppet characters are dubbed in by different actors than the TV series, except for Globey whose voice is still done by George McGrath.

In June 2010, various film news sites reported that Paul Reubens was working with Judd Apatow on a new Pee-wee Herman feature film.

In February 2015, Netflix acquired the rights to produce a new Pee-wee film entitled Pee-wee's Big Holiday with Apatow and Reubens producing the film, John Lee directing, and Reubens and Paul Rust writing the screenplay. The film released on March 18, 2016, on Netflix to positive reception.

Filmography

Film

Television

Video games

References

External links

 
 
 

1952 births
Living people
Male actors from New York (state)
American male comedians
American game show hosts
American male television actors
American television writers
American male television writers
American male voice actors
Daytime Emmy Award winners
Male actors from Los Angeles
Actors from Sarasota, Florida
People from Peekskill, New York
California Institute of the Arts alumni
Sarasota High School alumni
People from Oneonta, New York
Comedians from California
Comedians from New York (state)
Screenwriters from New York (state)
Screenwriters from Florida
Screenwriters from California
Pee-wee Herman
Jewish American male actors
Jewish male comedians
Jewish American male comedians